Zoltowski or Żółtowski is a surname. Notable people with the surname include:

Frank B. Zoltowski (born 1957), Australian astronomer
Maciej Żółtowski (born 1971), Polish conductor and composer
Marceli Żółtowski (1812–1901), Polish count and politician

Polish-language surnames